Postgate is a surname, and may refer to:
 The Postgate family, whose members include:
 John Percival Postgate, British classical scholar
 Margaret Postgate, married name Margaret Cole, daughter of John
 Nicholas Postgate (1596 or 1597 – 1679), English Catholic martyr (probably in the same family as the other Postgates)
 Nicholas Postgate (academic), Professor of Assyriology at the University of Cambridge
 Oliver Postgate, British animator, son of Raymond
 Raymond Postgate, British historian, son of John
 Daniel Postgate,British writer, son of Oliver